Edward Day may refer to:
 J. Edward Day (1914–1996), American businessman and political office-holder
 Edward William Day (1901–1985), U.S. federal judge
 Edward Day (cross-country skier) (born 1949), Canadian cross-country skier
 Edward Day (priest) (1738–1808), Archdeacon of Ardfert
 Edward Denny Day (1801–1876), Irish-Australian police magistrate

See also
 Ned Day (1945–1987), journalist
 Edward Dayes (1763–1804), artist